"The Ideal Height" is a song by Scottish rock band Biffy Clyro, released as the first single from their second studio album, The Vertigo of Bliss (2003), on 24 March 2003. On the UK Singles Chart, it peaked at number 46.

Track listings
Songs and lyrics by Simon Neil. Music by Biffy Clyro.

CD (BBQ365CD)
 "The Ideal Height" – 3:41
 "...And With The Scissorkick Is Victorious" – 5:24
 "Do You Remember What You Came For?" – 3:31

7" (BBQ365)
 "The Ideal Height" – 3:41
 "...And with the Scissorkick Is Victorious" – 5:24

Personnel
 Simon Neil – guitar, vocals
 James Johnston – bass, vocals
 Ben Johnston – drums, vocals
 Chris Sheldon – producer

Charts

References

External links
"The Ideal Height" Lyrics
"The Ideal Height" Guitar Tablature

2003 singles
Biffy Clyro songs
Songs written by Simon Neil
Song recordings produced by Chris Sheldon
2003 songs
Beggars Banquet Records singles